The dusky-tailed canastero (Pseudasthenes humicola) is a species of bird in the family Furnariidae. It is found in Chile. Its natural habitats are subtropical or tropical dry shrubland and subtropical or tropical high-altitude shrubland.

References

}
dusky-tailed canastero
Birds of Chile
dusky-tailed canastero
Taxa named by Heinrich von Kittlitz
Taxonomy articles created by Polbot